is a railway station on the Keihan Electric Railway Nakanoshima Line in Kita-ku, Osaka, Japan, and opened on October 19, 2008 (the day of the opening of the Nakanoshima Line).

Station layout
There is an island platform with two tracks underground.

Surroundings
Yodoyabashi Station (Keihan Line, Osaka Municipal Subway Midosuji Line)
Nakanoshima Park
Osaka Suijo Bus Yodoyabashi Port
Nakanoshima Itchōme, Kita-ku
Osaka City Hall
Nakanoshima Nichōme, Kita-ku
Bank of Japan Osaka Branch
Dōjimahama Itchōme, Kita-ku
ANA Crown Plaza Hotel Osaka (Airport limousine for Kansai International Airport departs from the entrance.)
New Daibiru
Osaka Mitsubishi Building
Nishi-Tenma Nichōme, Kita-ku
Osaka High Court, Osaka District Court, Osaka Summary Court

Adjacent stations

Oebashi Station
Railway stations in Japan opened in 2008
Stations of Keihan Electric Railway
Railway stations in Osaka Prefecture